(8035) 1992 TB is an Apollo asteroid, a type of Near-Earth Object. It is also a Venus-crosser and a Mars-crosser, although it doesn't make close approaches to Mars.

Encounters with Venus and Earth 
1992 TB makes close approaches to Earth, but often comes many times closer to Venus. Soon after the discovery of the asteroid in 1992, a close approaches of Earth was made. Three years after it was discovered, 1992 TB came  from Earth. In 2003, (8035) 1992 TB was listed as a potentially hazardous object, but has since been removed. However, 1992 TB is not expected to come within  of Earth in the near future. On the other hand, 1992 TB can come much closer to Venus. Its next Venus encounter was in 29 May 2015, where it came  from the planet. Its closest approach in the near future will be .

Notes

References

External links 
 
 
 

Apollo asteroids
Discoveries by the Spacewatch project
Earth-crossing asteroids
Venus-crossing asteroids
19921002